is a passenger railway station in the city of Kiryū, Gunma, Japan, operated by the private railway operator Jōmō Electric Railway Company.

Lines

Station layout
The station has one island platform connected to the station building by a level crossing. The station is unattended.

Platforms

Adjacent stations

History
Tennōjuku Station was opened as a signal stop on March 10, 1938 and elevated to a full passenger station on December 6, 1957.

Passenger statistics
In fiscal 2019, the station was used by an average of 180 passengers daily (boarding passengers only).

Surrounding area
 Kiryū Aioi Post Office
 Kiryū Meiji-kan (former Aioi village hall)

See also
 List of railway stations in Japan

References

External links

  
	

Stations of Jōmō Electric Railway
Railway stations in Gunma Prefecture
Railway stations in Japan opened in 1938
Kiryū, Gunma